Dragan Mance (26 September 1962 – 3 September 1985) was a Yugoslav footballer who played as a striker. He spent the majority of his career at Partizan, earning a legendary status among the club's supporters. Mance died in a car accident while traveling to a training session, 23 days before his 23rd birthday.

Club career
Mance started out at his local club Galenika Zemun, joining them at the relatively late age of 15. He quickly showed his promising talent, making his senior debut in the Yugoslav Second League at the age of 17. In September 1980, Mance was transferred to Partizan in exchange for experienced striker Slobodan Santrač who moved in the opposite direction.

Mance made his league debut for Partizan on 22 November 1980 in a 1–1 home draw with Sarajevo, coming on as a second-half substitute. He made five more league appearances until the end of the 1980–81 season. On 12 August 1981, Mance scored his first league goal for the club in a 1–0 home win over Radnički Niš. He finished the 1981–82 campaign with five goals in 21 league appearances. Mance was the team's leading scorer in the 1982–83 season, helping them win the Yugoslav First League after five years. He made 28 league appearances and scored eight goals in the following 1983–84 campaign.

In 1984–85, Mance again finished as the club's top scorer. He is arguably best remembered for scoring a spectacular long-range goal away at Queens Park Rangers in the first leg of the UEFA Cup second round. Despite a 2–6 loss at Highbury, Partizan progressed to the next round after defeating them 4–0 in the return leg at home. Mance scored the opening goal of the match that was placed 70th on the list of the "Top 100 Greatest Matches" by Eurosport in 2009.

In the summer of 1985, after much speculation, Mance signed a new four-year contract with Partizan which would keep him at the club until 1989. He eventually played his last match on 1 September 1985, scoring the team's second goal from the penalty spot to give Partizan a 2–1 home league win over Budućnost Titograd.

International career
At international level, Mance was capped four times for Yugoslavia. He made his national team debut on 23 April 1983 in a friendly against France, a 4–0 away loss. His last cap came in November of the same year in another friendly versus France, a 0–0 home draw.

Death

Mance died on 3 September 1985 in a car accident on the road while driving in his Peugeot 205 to the team's training session. He was buried at Belgrade New Cemetery. His funeral was attended by 30,000 people. Mance was survived by his parents, Ferdinand and Dušanka, and younger brother, Goran.

Career statistics

Club

International

Honours
Partizan
 Yugoslav First League: 1982–83

References

External links

 
 

Association football forwards
Burials at Belgrade New Cemetery
FK Partizan players
FK Zemun players
People from Zemun
Road incident deaths in Serbia
Road incident deaths in Yugoslavia
Serbian footballers
Footballers from Belgrade
Yugoslav First League players
Yugoslav footballers
Yugoslav Second League players
Yugoslavia international footballers
Yugoslavia under-21 international footballers
1962 births
1985 deaths